The 2022 Liga 1 de Fútbol Profesional (known as the Liga 1 Betsson 2022 for sponsorship reasons) was the 106th season of the Peruvian Primera División, the highest division of Peruvian football. A total of 19 teams competed in the season, which began on 4 February and ended on 12 November 2022. The season was originally scheduled to start on 21 January 2022, but the date was pushed back due to the detection of several COVID-19 cases in the participating clubs.

Defending champions Alianza Lima won their twenty-fifth league championship in this season, defeating Melgar in the finals after losing the first leg 1–0 and winning the second leg 2–0, for a 2–1 score on aggregate.

Competition format
The season was divided into three stages: Torneo Apertura, Torneo Clausura, and the Playoffs. Both Apertura and Clausura tournaments were played under a single round-robin format with the 19 teams playing each other once. The winners of the Apertura and Clausura stages qualified for the playoffs, as long as they ended the season in the top eight of the aggregate table, along with the top two teams on the aggregate table at the end of the season.

The four teams qualified for the playoffs were to play two double-legged semifinals with the winners playing the finals to decide the national champion, unless any of the following conditions is met:

If one of the Apertura or Clausura tournament winners also ended up in the top two of the aggregate table, they would get a bye to the finals and the remaining two teams would play a semifinal to decide the other finalist.  
If both Apertura and Clausura tournament winners ended up placing in the top two of the aggregate table, the semifinals would not be played and both teams would get a bye to the finals. 
If one team won both the Apertura and Clausura tournaments, the playoffs would not be played and that team would be declared as champion. 

The bottom two teams of the aggregate table at the end of the season were relegated, while the 17th placed team of the aggregate table played the Liga 2 runner-up in a double-legged playoff (Revalidación) to remain in Liga 1.

Teams
Originally, 18 teams were slated to play in the 2022 Liga 1 season. The top fifteen teams in the 2021 Liga 1 would take part, along with the 2021 Liga 2 champions Atlético Grau, the 2021 Copa Perú champions ADT, and the Revalidación winners Carlos Stein.

On 20 January 2022 Binacional, who had originally placed 16th in the 2021 Liga 1 aggregate table and were relegated following their defeat to Carlos Stein in the Revalidación, were reinstated in the competition due to a ruling by the Court of Arbitration for Sport which overturned a 3–0 win awarded to Cusco in their Fase 2 match against Cienciano. Due to this, Binacional moved up to 15th place in the aggregate table and Cusco fell to 17th place and were relegated.

On 21 January 2022, the FPF confirmed that they would abide by the CAS ruling and also ruled out a replay of the Revalidación series, this time between Carlos Stein and Universidad San Martín who went up to 16th place in the 2021 Liga 1 aggregate table as an effect of this ruling, with which Universidad San Martín also avoided relegation whilst Carlos Stein's promotion was confirmed, meaning that the league would be contested by 19 teams.

Stadia and locations

Managerial changes

Notes

Torneo Apertura

Standings

Results

Torneo Clausura

Standings

Results

Aggregate table

Playoffs

Semi-final

First leg

Second leg

Melgar won 4–0 on aggregate and advanced to the finals.

Finals

First leg

Second leg

Alianza Lima won 2–1 on aggregate.

Relegation playoff

Unión Comercio won 4–2 on aggregate and were promoted to Liga 1. Ayacucho were relegated to Liga 2.

Top scorers

Source: Futbolperuano.com

See also
 2022 Supercopa Peruana
 2022 Copa Bicentenario
 2022 Liga 2
 2022 Copa Perú
 2022 Ligas Departamentales del Peru
 2022 Torneo de Promoción y Reserva
 2022 Liga Femenina
 2022 Copa Perú Femenina

References

External links
Official website 
Liga 1 news at Peru.com 
Liga 1 statistics and news at Dechalaca.com 

2022
Peru
Peru